Neilson Gray Hubbard (born October 27, 1972) is an American record producer, film director, film producer, singer-songwriter, and photographer. He produced Mary Gauthier's Grammy-nominated album, Rifles & Rosary Beads, as well as albums for Sam Baker, Kim Richey, and Glen Phillips. He directs and produces music videos and documentaries through his company, Neighborhoods Apart, which produced the Orphan Brigade's (Hubbard's band) documentary and soundtrack, The Orphan Brigade: Soundtrack to a Ghost Story, which won a number of awards. His collaborations with artist Matthew Perryman Jones have been featured in Private Practice, One Tree Hill, Bones, Grey's Anatomy, and several films.

Early life
Neilson Hubbard was born on October 27, 1972 in Jackson, Mississippi to Dale and Suzy Hubbard. He was an All City baseball player and football player throughout high school. He began singing in talent shows at age seven, and learned to play the guitar in high school. He learned to play the keyboard in his early twenties.

Music career
Hubbard's first band was called This Living Hand, formed with producer Clay Jones. They signed to Adam Duritz's label, E Pluribus Unum, and toured nationally with The Counting Crows and The Wallflowers. After the band split up, Hubbard went on to record three solo albums, The Slide Project, Why Men Fail, and Sing into Me. He also collaborated with Matthew Ryan to form the band Strays Don't Sleep.

Spoon

Childhood friends from Jackson, Mississippi, Hubbard and Clay Jones moved to Oxford to study literature at the University of Mississippi, where they met violinist Helena Lamb. The three began working on songs that Hubbard had written that didn't fit into their previous bands. Hubbard, Jones, and Lamb adopted the name Spoon, and recorded their first song, "Say Something Warm", in one day. They soon began playing live as a trio in bars, coffee houses, college lunch rooms, and restaurants.

During that first year of shows, Spoon recorded the tracks that would make up their second album, Holding Flowers, produced and recorded by Justin Martin. They released the album on their own Lunch Pale label in the fall of 1993. The group added a rhythm section to their lineup, including Garrison Starr playing the snare and ride cymbal, and Jones picked up the bass for the quartet's live shows. Near the end of 1994, Lamb left the group, leaving Hubbard and Jones to continue through 1995 with a two-guitar, drums, and bass lineup.

This Living Hand

The name "This Living Hand" is derived from the title of a poem by John Keats. The band's songs were written by vocalist and guitarist Hubbard; guitarist Jones was responsible for arrangements and production. In the summer of 1995 the band signed with E Pluribus Unum Recordings in Los Angeles and released their first full-length album, Consolation Prize, in October, with a national tour following. The album was recorded over four days at Easley Studios in Memphis. This Living Hand recorded a second album, The TV Sounds Worried, in 1996 but it was shelved by the record label and remains unreleased to this day.

Hubbard moved to Nashville, opened Mr. Lemons' Studio, and continued producing records for Garrison Starr, Glen Phillips, Strays Don't Sleep, Michelle Malone, Jeremy Lister, Matthew Perryman Jones, and other musicians.

Strays Don't Sleep

Matthew Ryan approached Hubbard in 2004 about a collaboration. The collaboration was successful, and Strays Don't Sleep was formed with Hubbard, Brian Bequette, Billy Mercer and Steve Latanation.

In the autumn of 2005, Strays Don't Sleep's self-titled debut was released in the UK on One Little Indian. The release includes a DVD of short films that were directed and shot by professional filmmakers and friends, including Gorman Bechard, the Barnes Brothers, Martin Glenn, Matt Boyd, and Jared Johnson. Ryan and Hubbard directed three of the short films, with the help of Nashville film student Matt Riddlehoover. A 5.1 Surround Sound mix of the entire record and films, by Paul PDub Walton of Björk and Sneaker Pimps fame, is available on the DVD.

Strays Don't Sleep was released to positive reviews from Time Out, Uncut, The Sunday Express and The Times. The success helped secure a US release, which was helped further by a placement on the hit CW (former WB) drama One Tree Hill. "For Blue Skies", a song concerning the sentencing of Matthew Ryan's brother to 30 years in prison, was made available on the One Tree Hill soundtrack. Strays Don't Sleep toured the UK with Josh Rouse to support the album. In April 2006, their video album Strays Don't Sleep won the Grand Remi Award at the WorldFest-Houston International Film Festival for Best Music Video, and the band's performance received a standing ovation. In mid-2006, the group was officially disbanded.

In 2008, Hubbard released a new solo record, I Love Your Muscles.

The Orphan Brigade
The Orphan Brigade was formed in 2014 by founding members Hubbard, Ben Glover, and Joshua Britt. The group spent a year writing and recording their first album, Soundtrack to a Ghost Story, in the allegedly haunted Octagon Hall in Franklin, Kentucky. The group set out to tell the story of this eerie architectural oddity and the family, soldiers, and servants who lived and died there. They looked for inspiration and possible encounters with the spirits of this place. Additional appearances include John Prine, Kim Richey, Gretchen Peters, and Will Kimbrough.

Hubbard's film production company, Neighborhoods Apart, produced and directed the documentary The Orphan Brigade: Soundtrack to a Ghost Story, which was nominated for Best Original Song at the Nashville Film Festival. They have since released two albums, Heart of the Cave (2017) and To the Edge of the World (2019).

Discography

The Orphan Brigade
 2019 – To The Edge of the World
 2017 – Heart of the Cave
 2015 – Soundtrack to a Ghost Story

Buffalo Blood
 2019 – Buffalo Blood

Strays Don't Sleep
 2006 – Strays Don't Sleep

Solo Projects
 2021 – Digging Up The Scars
 2018 – Cumberland Island
 2013 – I'll Be the Tugboat
 2010 – Do You Want to Start a Fire
 2008 – I love Your Muscles
 2003 – Sing into Me
 2000 – Why Men Fail
 1997 –  The Slide Project

This Living Hand
 1996 – Consolation Prize
 1966 – The TV Sounds Worried

Spoon
 1992 – Say Something Warm
 1993 – Holding Flowers

Music production

 2019 – The Orphan Brigade – To The Edge of The World
 2019 – Buffalo Blood – Buffalo Blood
 2019 – Amy Speace – Me and the Ghost of Charlemagne (Best International Song, American UK) 
 2018 – Ben Glover – Shorebound (UK Americana Album of the Year)
 2018 – Dean Owens – Southern Wind (UK Title Track winner, Best Song, Americana)
 2018 – Mary Gauthier –  Rifles & Rosary Beads (Grammy-nominated)
 2017 – The Orphan Brigade –  Heart of the Cave
 2017 – Sam Baker – Land of Doubt
 2015 – The Orphan Brigade – Soundtrack to a Ghost Story
 2018 – Dean Owens – Into The Sea
 2015 – Caroline Spence – Hearts and Spades
 2015 – Audrey Spillman – Thornbird
 2014 – The Farewell Drifers – Forever Tomorrow
 2013 – Kim Richey – Thorn in my Heart
 2011 – The Farewell Drifters – Echo Boom
 2011 – The Apache Relay – American Nomad
 2009 – Tyler James – It Took the Fire
 2006 – Amelia White – Black Doves
 2006 – Strays Don't Sleep – Strays Don't Sleep
 2006 – Glen Phillips – Mr. Lemons
 2006 – Matthew Ryan – From a Late Night High-Rise
 2006 – Matthew Perryman Jones – Throwing Punches in the Dark
 2006 – Mack Starks – Blind Spot
 2005 – Garrison Star – The Sound of You and Me
 2005 – David Knopfler – America
 2004 – Kate York – Sadly Love

Video production
 2020 – Tommy Emamnuel – Fuel
 2020 – Lilly Hiatt – Candy Launch
 2019 – Lilly Hiatt – Brightest Star
 2019 – Amy Speace – Me and the Ghost of Charlemagne 
 2018 – John Prine – Ways of a Woman in Love
 2018 – John Prine – Daughter and Egg Night
 2018 – Gretchen Peters – Arguing with Ghosts
 2018 – Aaron Lee Tasjan – Heart Slows Down
 2018 – Ben Glover – Kindness
 2107 – Jason Isbell – If We Were Vampires
 2017 – Amanda Shires – Harmless
 2017 – Jason Isbell – Hope the High Road
 2017 – Blind Boys of Alabama – See by Faith

Documentaries
 2018 – Rifles & Rosemary Beads – Mary Gauthier'
 2015 – Soundtrack to a Ghost Story – The Orphan Brigade

References

External links

Living people
1972 births
Country musicians from Mississippi
Musicians from Jackson, Mississippi
University of Mississippi alumni
American alternative country singers
American male pop singers
American male singer-songwriters
American pop rock singers
Singer-songwriters from Mississippi
Businesspeople from Jackson, Mississippi
21st-century American singers
21st-century American male singers
Parasol Records artists
Proper Records artists